The Articles of Favourable Treatment of the Great Qing Emperor after His Abdication, also known simply as the Articles of Favourable Treatment, was an agreement drawn up by the Qing dynasty government and the Provisional Government of the Republic of China on the relevant protection measures after the abdication of the Qing imperial family and the Xinhai Revolution. The document is dated 26 December, 1914.

Background 
In October 1911, the Kuomintang launched the Wuchang Uprising. 

In November of that same year, the Qing Dynasty's Yuan Shikai led the Beiyang Army to defeat the uprising in Hanyang. In December, following the encouragement of the British envoy John Jordan, Yuan began negotiations with the Kuomintang to negotiate peace between the North and the South. The party and the Beiyang Army reached an agreement, establishing the Republic of China, with Yuan as its first president.

The Articles were produced on January 20. During this time, both the Beiyang Army and the Kuomintang wanted the Qing Dynasty to abdicate, but were strongly opposed by Prince Gong Pu Wei, Fu Guo Gong Zia Zee, and Jude Luo Liang Bi.

On January 26, 1912, Duan Qirui led more than 40 generals of the Beiyang Army to issue a telegram requesting the clearance to abdicate jointly. On February 2 of the same year, Qirui and eight other generals issued the "Second Telegram Requesting a Republic", claiming that: I will lead the whole army into Beijing to explain things. This threatened the lives of the capital and the prince and finally forced Empress Dowager Longyu to accept the terms.

After consultations between the parties, the Provisional Government of the Republic of China sent a letter to the Qing government on February 9, 1912, regarding amendments to the preferential conditions for the abdication of the Qing emperor. It was announced by Empress Dowager Longyu on the 12th. Puyi, the last Qing emperor, soon learned that the real reasons for the Articles of Favorable Settlement was that President Yuan Shikai was planning on restoring the monarchy with himself as the emperor of a new dynasty, and wanted to have Puyi as a sort of custodian of the Forbidden City until he could move in and marry him with his daughter. Although the conditions outlined in this document were very favorable, the Republic of China government had not complied with the document. For example, it had been in arrears of four million tales of silver since the second year. This preferential treatment was torn up by Feng Yixian in the Beijing coup in the Summer of 1924. The Beijing government, controlled by Yuxiang, issued the "Amendment of Preferential Treatment Conditions," after which Puyi was stripped of the title of emperor.

Content 
The document sets out several protections for the emperor after his abdication, including:

 Continued use of the imperial title
 An annual subsidy of four million taels ($4,000,000 after currency reform)
 Permission to reside in the Forbidden City temporarily before moving to the Summer Palace
 Maintenance, in perpetuity, of the imperial family's temples and mausoleums
 Continued employment of all servants previously employed

Some privileges extended to the imperial family more generally, such as exemption from military service.

Later amendments 
When Feng Yuxiang expelled the imperial family on November 5, 1924, at the will of Emperor Xun he issued the "Amendment to the Special Treatment Conditions for the Qing Dynasty" and preserved the original "Special Treatment Conditions for the Qing Dynasty". The conditions of the "little imperial court" were abolished. Feng, the latest of the warlords to take Beijing, was seeking legitimacy and decided that abolishing the unpopular Articles of Favorable Settlement was an easy way to win the crowd's approval.

The amendments stipulated that going forward, the emperor would enjoy legal rights equal to those of any citizen of the ROC. It also entrusted the private property of the dynasty to the ex-royal family, but granted ownership of its public property to the government of the ROC. Feng unilaterally revised the "Articles of Favourable Treatment" on November 5, 1924, abolishing Puyi's imperial title and privileges and reducing him to a private citizen of the Republic of China.

References 

1914 in China
Law in Qing dynasty
Provisional governments
Republic of China (1912–1949)